The white-headed bulbul (Hypsipetes thompsoni) is a songbird species in the bulbul family, Pycnonotidae.

It is found in Myanmar and north-western Thailand. Its natural habitats are subtropical or tropical moist lowland forest and subtropical or tropical moist montane forest. It is not considered a threatened species by the IUCN.

Taxonomy and systematics 

The white-headed bulbul was previously placed in the monotypic genus Cerasophila (literally meaning "cherry-lover"). Following recently molecular phylogenetic studies, it is now placed in the genus Hypsipetes. Alternate names for the white-headed bulbul include Bingham's bulbul and brown-vented bulbul.

Footnotes

References
 Gregory, Steven M. (2000): Nomenclature of the Hypsipetes Bulbuls (Pycnonotidae). Forktail 16: 164–166. PDF fulltext

white-headed bulbul
Birds of Myanmar
Birds of Thailand
white-headed bulbul
Taxonomy articles created by Polbot